The election for Resident Commissioner to the United States House of Representatives took place on November 5, 1940, the same day as the larger Puerto Rican general election and the United States elections, 1940.

Candidates for Resident Commissioner
 Antonio Fernós-Isern for the Popular Democratic Party
 Miguel A. Garcia Mendez for the Tripartite Puerto Rican Unification Party
 Bolívar Pagán for the Republican Union

Election results

See also 
Puerto Rican general election, 1940

References 

Puerto Rico
1940